Lagg is a hamlet on Lagg Bay, on the east coast of the island of Jura, in the council area of Argyll and Bute, Scotland. It is on the A846  from Craighouse. Lagg consists of two main areas, Lagg township, above a steep slope from the bay, away from the coastal edge. The former inn is the other. Dunchraobhan (a single dwelling) is at a similar elevation to Lagg.

History 
The name "Lagg" means "The hollow". It once was linked from Knapdale with a ferry, which in the 1800s was the principal ferry route from Jura. A proposal to have a car ferry to the mainland was voted against by residents due to increased traffic from people travelling to Islay. Lagg once had a population of 70 but now only four houses remain in the entire glen. Lagg once had a school, a post office and an inn called Lagg Inn which is now Lagg Farm.

References 

Hamlets in Argyll and Bute
Villages on Jura, Scotland